Ivan Kljaković Gašpić (born 24 May 1984) is a Croatian sailor. He competed at the 2008 and 2012 Summer Olympics in the Men's Finn class. He is a member of the JK Zenta sailing club in Croatia. His coach is Marin Siriscevic.

Sailing career
Gašpić started sailing at age 12 in an Optimist dinghy, encouraged by his father. He competed for the first time in 1997, and became the Optimist European Champion in 1998. The same year, he was named Dalmatia Athlete of the Year. He went on to win other junior competitions, becoming the European Junior Laser champion in 2003 and the European and World Junior Finn class champion in 2005. He won a silver medal at the 2007 Finn European Championship.

He later competed in the 2008 Summer Olympics in Beijing, placing eighth in the Finn class competition. The following year, he won a bronze medal at the Finn World Championship in Denmark, and in 2011 he placed tenth in the Finn class event at the ISAF Sailing World Championships in Perth.

He first entered the top 10 in the International Sailing Federation's Finn class world rankings in May 2006, and was placed number 1 in July 2009. He has remained in the top 5 since then, and is currently ranked third.

At the 2012 Summer Olympics, he finished in 5th place.

Personal life
Gašpić currently lives in Solin, Croatia. He is married and has two children. His nickname is Bambi. His 2012 Olympic profile lists his height as 189 cm and his weight as 95 kg.

References

1984 births
Living people
Olympic sailors of Croatia
Croatian male sailors (sport)
Sailors at the 2008 Summer Olympics – Finn
Sailors at the 2012 Summer Olympics – Finn
Sportspeople from Split, Croatia
Sailors at the 2016 Summer Olympics – Finn
Green Comm Racing sailors
21st-century Croatian people